Veldmate is a surname. Notable people with the surname include:

Jeroen Veldmate (born 1988), Dutch footballer
Mark Veldmate (born 1984), Dutch footballer